Phyllachora gratissima is a plant pathogen infecting avocados.

References

External links
 Index Fungorum

Fungal plant pathogens and diseases
Avocado tree diseases
Phyllachorales